Molovata Nouă is a commune located in Dubăsari District of the Republic of Moldova, on the eastern bank of the River Dniester. It consists  of two villages, Molovata Nouă and Roghi.

During the 1992 War of Transnistria, the commune was located in the immediate vicinity of heavy fighting. Since the war Molovata Nouă has been controlled by the government of the Republic of Moldova, while Roghi is partly controlled by the secessionist government of Transnistria. The only link between Molovata Nouă and territory controlled by the Government of Moldova is by ferry boat across the Dniester River.

Population
According to the 2004 Moldovan Census, the village Molovata Nouă had a population of 1,851, of which 1,824 were ethnic Moldavians, 23 were from ethnic minorities, and 4 were other or undeclared.

Notable people
 Anatol Codru (1936–2010), writer and film director

References

External links

Communes of Dubăsari District
Populated places on the Dniester